Curtis Henderson (November 12, 1911 – January 12, 1982) was an American Negro league shortstop in the 1930s and 1940s.

A native of Shreveport, Louisiana, Henderson made his Negro leagues debut in 1936 with the Homestead Grays and Brooklyn Royal Giants. He went on to play with several teams, and was selected to the 1940 East–West All-Star Game. Henderson served in the US Army during World War II, and returned to finish his professional career in 1946 with the New York Black Yankees. He died in New York, New York in 1982 at age 70.

References

External links
 and Baseball-Reference Black Baseball stats and Seamheads

1911 births
1982 deaths
Brooklyn Royal Giants players
Chicago American Giants players
Homestead Grays players
New York Black Yankees players
Philadelphia Stars players
Toledo Crawfords players
Washington Black Senators players
20th-century African-American sportspeople
United States Army personnel of World War II
African Americans in World War II
African-American United States Army personnel
Burials at Long Island National Cemetery